For the invasion of Java (1811), under the auspices of Lord Minto, the British government hired a number of transport vessels. Most of the transports were "country ships". Country ships were vessels that were registered in ports of British India such as Bombay and Calcutta, and that traded around India, with Southeast Asia, and China, but that did not sail to England without special authorization from the EIC. In addition, some of the transports for the invasion were "regular ships" of the British East India Company (EIC), and some were "extra ships". Regular ships were on a long term contract with the EIC, and extra ships were vessels the EIC had chartered for one or more voyages.

The data in the table below comes primarily from two sources. An 1814 report from a Select Committee of the House of Commons of the British Parliament provided the data only on country ships, giving the names of a large number of vessels, and their burthen (bm). Then the Naval Chronicle published a list of vessels than had assembled at Malacca in May–June 1811 and then sailed for Java. The list in the Naval Chronicle also included the names of British Royal Navy warships, EIC warships, and other EIC vessels, particularly regular and extra ships. A number of transports in the Select Committee report do not show up as having sailed from Malacca. Equally, a number of transports in the Naval Chronicle list are not in the Select Committee report. Transports without burthen data are in the Naval Chronicle but not in the Select Committee report.

Names of vessels that appear in both lists do not always agree. Some vessels in the Select Committee report that have compound names such as "Bombay Anna" or "Arab Mary" appear in the Naval Chronicle as Bombay and Anna, and as Arab and Mary. Also, transliteration of non-English names shows no consistency across sources, making it extremely difficult to try to find more information about the vessels in question.

Many of the transports gathered at Malacca and then left in four divisions on the following days:
 1st division: 7 June 1811
 2nd division: 11 June
 3rd division: 14 June
 4th division: 17 June

Notes

Citations

References
 
 
 

Age of Sail merchant ships of England
Ships of the British East India Company
Lists of sailing ships
Lists of ships of the United Kingdom